"Lad ikke solen gå ned" is a song by Danish singer Basim and Lis Sørensen. The song was released in Denmark in October 2009 as the second single from his second studio album Befri dig selv (2009). The song has peaked to number 15 on the Danish Singles Chart.

Track listing

Chart performance

Weekly charts

Release  history

References

2009 singles
2009 songs
Basim songs
Universal Music Group singles